Doyle Park may refer to:

 Doyle Community Park, in Santa Rosa, California
 Doyle Community Park & Center, in Leominster, Massachusetts
 Doyle Memorial Park, in Wishek, North Dakota